Patricia Elsmore-Sautter (born 28 February 1979) is a Swiss ice hockey player. She competed in the women's tournament at the 2006 Winter Olympics.

References

1979 births
Living people
Swiss women's ice hockey goaltenders
Olympic ice hockey players of Switzerland
Ice hockey players at the 2006 Winter Olympics
People from Schaffhausen
Sportspeople from the canton of Schaffhausen